The Transformers: Infiltration is a six-issue comic book mini-series, published by IDW Publishing, based on the Transformers. The series was previewed with a #0 in October, 2005, formally launched with #1 in January 2006 and ended with #6 in July.

Written by long-time Transformers writer Simon Furman, it is a new origin for the Generation 1 Transformers, and also marks the beginning of the Hasbro Comic Book Universe. The element of disguise is a major focus, as the Transformers have been living unnoticed amongst humans for several years. Their first contact with humans on Earth is chronicled in this series. Most of the Transformers have updated alternate modes of current vehicles, although recognizable due to paint schemes similar to their original incarnations. The series is available in The Transformers: Volume 1.

Story

Characters
Being a new series and continuity, the Transformers featured in Infiltration are based upon their original characters featuring updated modern bodies. Any difference in their personalities goes unnoticed.

Autobots
Bumblebee
Ironhide
Jazz
Optimus Prime
Prowl
Ratchet
Sunstreaker
Wheeljack

Decepticons
Astrotrain
Megatron
Runabout
Runamuck
Skywarp
Starscream
Thundercracker

Humans
Verity Carlo
Hunter O'Nion
Jimmy Pink

Plot summary

Analysis
The biggest difference in this new G1 continuity is that the Autobots and Decepticons only recently arrived on Earth, rather than having been buried here for four million years. They have communications with forces off-world, and Optimus Prime and Megatron are seen in Cybertronian modes. While Optimus upgrades into an Earth-based alternate-mode, Megatron retains his unique tank mode, although he is still familiar looking with his helmet, black arm cannon and silver paint.

This storyline explores more elements of the Transformers hiding on Earth. The Decepticons have multiple bases, with the Autobots discreetly hiding themselves amongst traffic with holographic drivers. Ratchet is also seen deploying a smoke screen.  In addition, the Decepticons place more stock in stealth in this continuity, preferring to destabilize a planet's society covertly before striking rather than attacking directly with the arrogant belief that their larger size and technological superiority will triumph over the "puny fleshlings".

Also exploring elements of the Transformers' presence is that there are conspiracy theorists like Hunter looking at evidence of their existence, and the whole plot revolves around the Decepticons attempting to cover up a massive piece of evidence. In particular, focus is given to the mysterious Machination, who represent the potential government interest and exploitation of the Transformers and their technological nature.

The Autobots and Decepticons bases are the reverse of what they are in other incarnations: The Autobots have an underwater base while the Decepticons are based out of a mountain.

Followed by
Infiltration heralded the start of IDW's new continuity based on the Generation One characters, allowing Simon Furman to finally write his version of the Transformers without any continuity baggage whatsoever.

The story overlaps with The Transformers: Stormbringer and continues directly with The Transformers: Escalation. There are also prequel stories in The Transformers: Spotlight issues on Shockwave and Soundwave.

References

2005 comics debuts
2006 comics endings
Infiltration
IDW Publishing titles
Comic book limited series